Konstantinos Sfikas (born 24 October 1937) is a Greek athlete. He competed in the men's triple jump at the 1960 Summer Olympics.

References

1937 births
Living people
Athletes (track and field) at the 1960 Summer Olympics
Greek male triple jumpers
Olympic athletes of Greece
Place of birth missing (living people)
Mediterranean Games bronze medalists for Greece
Mediterranean Games medalists in athletics
Athletes (track and field) at the 1955 Mediterranean Games